Dolní Újezd is a municipality and village in Svitavy District in the Pardubice Region of the Czech Republic. It has about 2,000 inhabitants.

Paleontology
In 1960, a fragment of jawbone of a small-sized Cretaceous marine reptile (mosasaur) was found here.

References

Villages in Svitavy District